The literature of Maryland, United States, includes fiction, poetry, and  nonfiction. Representative authors include John Barth, H. L. Mencken, and Edgar Allan Poe.

History

A printing press began operating in St. Mary's City, Maryland, in 1685. Colonial-era writers included George Alsop (Character of the Province of Maryland, 1666); Ebenezer Cooke (Sot-Weed Factor, 1708).

Literary figures of the antebellum period included John Pendleton Kennedy (Swallow Barn, 1832); Edward Coote Pinkney (1802-1828). And most notably, Edgar Allan Poe of Baltimore, whom John Pendelton Kennedy supported financially for years.

Awards and events
The Maryland General Assembly created the position of Poet Laureate of Maryland in 1959. The Baltimore Book Festival began around 1996.

See also
 :Category:Writers from Maryland
 List of newspapers in Maryland
 :Category:Maryland in fiction
 :Category:Libraries in Maryland
 Southern United States literature
 American literary regionalism

References

Bibliography

 
 
 
 
  (Includes information about Maryland literature)

External links
 
 

American literature by state
literature